Kakanda may be,

Kakanda language
Kakanda mines